Full-size wagon may refer to:
Passenger full-size vans
Large SUVs
Older family station wagons

Station wagons
Sport utility vehicles